"Slow and Easy" is a song performed by American rhythm and blues band Zapp (then credited as Zapp & Roger), issued as the second and final single from their first greatest hits album All the Greatest Hits. It was written by Roger Troutman, Larry Troutman and Shirley Murdock; and was produced by Roger. The song is the band's highest chart appearance to date on the Billboard Hot 100, peaking at #43 in 1993.

Chart positions

References

External links
 
 

1993 singles
Reprise Records singles
Song recordings produced by Roger Troutman
Songs written by Shirley Murdock
Songs written by Roger Troutman
Zapp (band) songs
Songs written by Larry Troutman
1993 songs
New jack swing songs